My Lady Friends is a 1921 American silent comedy film directed by Lloyd Ingraham and starring Carter DeHaven,  Flora Parker DeHaven and Thomas G. Lingham. It was based on the 1919 Broadway play of the same title  by Frank Mandel and Emil Nyitray.

Cast
 Carter DeHaven as James Smith
 Flora Parker DeHaven as 	Catherine Smith 
 Thomas G. Lingham as Edward Early
 Helen Raymond as 	Lucille Early
 Helen Lynch as Eva Johns
 Lincoln Stedman as Tom Trainer
 May Wallace as 	Hilda
 Hazel Howell as Nora
 Clara Morris as 	Gwen
 Ruth Ashby as Julia

References

Bibliography
 Connelly, Robert B. The Silents: Silent Feature Films, 1910-36, Volume 40, Issue 2. December Press, 1998.
 Munden, Kenneth White. The American Film Institute Catalog of Motion Pictures Produced in the United States, Part 1. University of California Press, 1997.

External links
 

1921 films
1921 comedy films
1920s English-language films
American silent feature films
Silent American comedy films
American black-and-white films
Films directed by Lloyd Ingraham
First National Pictures films
American films based on plays
1920s American films